South East Technological University (SETU) is a public technological university located in the South East region of Ireland. It was formed from the amalgamation of two existing institutes of technology in the region - Waterford IT and IT Carlow. Following years of discussions and planning, its formation was announced in November 2021 and was formally established on 1 May 2022. It is the only university in the South East of Ireland.

Background 
In 2013 the Irish government signed off on a plan to set up the first technological universities in Ireland. One of these TUs was to combine Institute of Technology Carlow with Waterford Institute of Technology. Waterford Institute of Technology had opened in 1970 as a Regional Technical College and adopted its present name on 7 May 1997. It first made an unsuccessful application to become a university in 2006, under the Universities Act 1997. Similarly, a third level institute was founded in Carlow in 1970, under the name Regional Technical College Carlow, which adopted its Institute of Technology, Carlow title in the '90s. Although this TU proposal was strongly supported by the southern region's Regional Spatial and Economic Strategy, development was temporarily delayed in 2014.

Timeline 
IT Carlow had been planning a joint application with Waterford IT for the formation of a Technological University for the South East region since the mid-2010s. A vision document, "Technological University for the South East" (TUSE) was published in 2015, and a memorandum of understanding was signed in 2017.

In May 2018, a spokesperson for the Higher Education Authority (HEA) expressed a belief that a formal application will be made in Autumn 2018, with an approval expected in spring 2019. At the launch of TU Dublin in July 2018, the Taoiseach expressed regret that this TUSE bid had not progressed sufficiently following the Technological Universities Act 2018.

The TUSEI bid was due to be submitted in September 2018.

In November 2018 Dr. Patricia Mulcahy, President of IT Carlow described the goal for TUSEI as "a leading European technological university recognised for regional connectedness and global impact".

Plans were being compiled in February 2019, and were awaiting financial clarification in May 2019.

Staff of Carlow IT rejected the proposal in June 2019, and WIT staff rejected it in April 2021.

In 2019 the Department of Education and Skills rejected requests to cover budget deficits in WIT.

In July 2020, Minister for Further and Higher Education, Research, Innovation and Science, Simon Harris appointed Tom Boland, of the HEA to lead the TU merger bid.

A formal application was lodged in May 2021. The Project Executive Director was Tom Boland

Proposal details 
SETU makes use of WIT's five campuses, and IT Carlow's three, including an enlarged campus in Wexford town, and a building in Rathnew, Co. Wicklow.

According to local TD John Paul Phelan, a campus in Kilkenny city is also a possibility.

References

External links 
 
 

 
Education in County Wicklow
Education in County Wexford
Institutes of technology in the Republic of Ireland
Educational institutions established in 2022
Education in Carlow (town)
Education in Waterford (city)
Technological universities in the Republic of Ireland
2022 establishments in Ireland
Universities established in the 2020s